Guduputani is a 1972 Telugu-language thriller film starring Krishna.

Plot
Krishna as Vijay attempts to save Shubha's character from being killed for her property by the villains in various attempts. The person who was trying to kill her is revealed in the last scene of the movie.

Soundtrack
All the songs were sung by P. Susheela and S. P. Balasubrahmanyam
"Thanivi Theeraledhe"
"Handsup Handsup" (Padyam)
"Kannulaina Teravani"
"O Maya Mudara Muggina" (Padyam)
"Pagalu Reyi Panduga"
"Veyyaku Oye Mava Cheyyi Veyyaku"
"Viriviga Kannalu" (Padyam)

References

1972 films
1970s Telugu-language films
Films directed by Lakshmi Deepak